Ondrej L. Krivanek  (born Ondřej Ladislav Křivánek; August 1, 1950) is a Czech/British physicist resident in the United States, and a leading developer of electron-optical instrumentation. He won the Kavli Prize for Nanoscience in 2020 for his substantial innovations in atomic resolution electron microscopy.

Life
He was born in Prague, and got his primary and secondary education there. In 1968 he moved to the UK, where he graduated from Leeds University and obtained his Ph.D. in Physics from Cambridge University  (Trinity College), and became a British citizen in 1975.  His post-doctoral work at Kyoto University, Bell Laboratories and UC Berkeley established him as a leading high resolution electron microscopist, who obtained some of the first atomic resolution images of grain boundaries in semiconductors and of interfaces in semiconductor devices.

Starting in the late 1970s, he designed a series of electron energy loss (EEL) spectrometers and imaging filters, first as a post-doc at UC Berkeley, then as an assistant professor at Arizona State University and a consultant to Gatan Inc., and later as director of R&D at Gatan.  These became highly successful, with over 500 installations world-wide. He also co-authored, with Channing Ahn, the EELS Atlas, now a standard reference for electron energy loss spectroscopy, pioneered the design and use of slow-scan CCD cameras for electron microscopy, and developed efficient microscope aberration diagnosis and tuning algorithms.  He also initiated the development and designed the first user interface of DigitalMicrograph, which went on to become the world's leading electron microscopy image acquisition and processing software.

The imaging filters he designed were corrected for second order aberrations and distortions, and he next took up the correction of third order aberrations, a key problem in electron microscopy. Following an unsuccessful application for funding in the US, he applied, successfully, for support to the Royal Society (jointly with L. Michael Brown FRS and Andrew Bleloch).  He then took an unpaid leave of absence from Gatan to develop an aberration corrector for a scanning transmission electron microscope (STEM) in Cambridge UK, together with Niklas Dellby and others.  In 1997, this led to the first STEM aberration corrector that succeeded in improving the resolution of the electron microscope it was built into.  Also in 1997 and with Niklas Dellby, he started Nion Co., where they produced a new corrector design.  In 2000 this corrector became the first commercially delivered electron microscope aberration corrector in the world (to IBM TJ Watson Research Center), and soon after delivery it produced the first directly interpretable sub-Å resolution images obtained by any type of an electron microscope.

Nion correctors delivered to Oak Ridge National Laboratory produced the first directly interpretable sub-Å resolution electron microscope images of a crystal lattice and the first EEL spectra of single atoms in a bulk solid.  Nion has since progressed onto designing and manufacturing whole scanning transmission electron microscopes that have produced many further world-leading results, such as atomic-resolution elemental mapping and analytical imaging in which every individual atom is resolved and identified.

In 2013, Nion introduced a new design of a monochromator for STEM that allowed the first demonstration of vibrational/phonon spectroscopy in the electron microscope, and can now reach 3 meV energy resolution at 20 kV. Used in tandem with the new Nion energy loss spectrometer, the monochromator has led to many revolutionary results. These include a 2016 demonstration of damage-free vibrational spectroscopy of different hydrogen environments in a biological material (Guanine), 2019 demonstrations of atomic resolution imaging using the phonon signal and of detecting and mapping an amino acid different in just one 12C atom being substituted by 13C (isotopic shift), and a 2020 detection of the vibrational signal from a single Si atom.

He is currently President of Nion Co. and Affiliate Professor at Arizona State University.

Awards
Honorary Doctorate, Masaryk University, Brno, Czechia (2022)
Kavli Prize for Nanoscience, 2020
Fellow of Microbeam Analysis Society of America, 2018
Special issue of Ultramicroscopy honoring Ondrej Krivanek's scientific career, 2017
Honorary Fellow of Robinson College, Cambridge UK, 2016
Cosslett Medal, International Federation of Microscopy Societies (2014)
Duncumb Award, Microbeam Analysis Society (2014)
Honorary Fellow of Royal Microscopical Society (2014)
Fellow of American Physical Society (2013).
election to Royal Society Fellowship (2010).
Distinguished Scientist Award of the Microscopy Society of America (2008)
Duddell Medal and Prize of the British Institute of Physics
Seto prize of the Japanese Microscopy Society (1999)
R&D100 Award (for imaging filter design, with A.J. Gubbens and N. Dellby, 1993)
1st places in special and parallel slaloms at the 1975 Oxford-Cambridge Varsity ski race
2nd place at the 2nd International Physics Olympiad (in Budapest in 1968, as team member for Czechoslovakia)

References 

1950 births
Living people
Scientists from Prague
Alumni of the University of Leeds
Alumni of Trinity College, Cambridge
British physicists
Czech physicists
Fellows of the Royal Society
Kavli Prize laureates in Nanoscience